Orgone is a pseudoscientific concept variously described as an esoteric energy or hypothetical universal life force. Originally proposed in the 1930s by Wilhelm Reich, and developed by Reich's student Charles Kelley after Reich's death in 1957, orgone was conceived as the anti-entropic principle of the universe, a creative substratum in all of nature comparable to Mesmer's animal magnetism (1779), to the Odic force (1845) of Carl Reichenbach and to Henri Bergson's élan vital (1907).  Orgone was seen as a massless, omnipresent substance, similar to luminiferous aether, but more closely associated with living energy than with inert matter. It could allegedly coalesce to create organization on all scales, from the smallest microscopic units—called "bions" in orgone theory—to macroscopic structures like organisms, clouds, or even galaxies.

Reich argued that deficits or constrictions in bodily orgone were at the root of many diseases, most prominently cancer, much as deficits or constrictions in the libido could produce neuroses in Freudian theory. Reich founded the Orgone Institute ca. 1942
to pursue research into orgone energy after he immigrated to the US in 1939; he used it to publish literature and distribute material relating to the topic for over a decade. Reich designed special "orgone energy accumulators"—devices ostensibly collecting orgone energy from the environment—to enable the study of orgone energy and to be applied medically to improve general health and vitality. Ultimately, the U.S. Food and Drug Administration (FDA) obtained a federal injunction barring the interstate distribution of orgone-related materials because Reich and his associates were making false and misleading claims. A judge later ruled to jail Reich and ordered the banning and destruction of all orgone-related materials at the institute after an associate of Reich violated the injunction. Reich denied the assertion that orgone accumulators could improve sexual health by providing orgastic potency.

The National Center for Complementary and Integrative Health lists orgone as a type of "putative energy". After Reich's death, research into the concept of orgone passed to some of his students, such as Kelley, and later to a new generation of scientists in Germany keen to discover an empirical basis for the orgone hypothesis (the first positive results of which were provided in 1989 by Stefan Muschenich).
There is no empirical support for the concept of orgone in medicine or the physical sciences, and research into the concept concluded with the end of the institute. Founded in 1982, the Institute for Orgonomic Science in New York is dedicated to the continuation of Reich's work; it both publishes a digital journal on it and collects corresponding works.

History

The concept of orgone belongs to Reich's later work after he immigrated to the US. Reich's early work was based on the Freudian concept of the libido, though influenced by sociological understandings with which Freud disagreed but which were to some degree followed by other prominent theorists such as Herbert Marcuse and Carl Jung. While Freud had focused on a solipsistic conception of mind in which unconscious and inherently selfish primal drives (primarily the sexual drive, or libido) were suppressed or sublimated by internal representations (cathexes) of parental figures (the superego), for Reich libido was a life-affirming force repressed by society directly. For example, in one of his better-known analyses, Reich observes a workers' political rally, noting that participants were careful not to violate signs that prohibited walking on the grass; Reich saw this as the state co-opting unconscious responses to parental authority as a means of controlling behavior. He was expelled from the Institute of Psycho-analysis because of these disagreements over the nature of the libido and his increasingly political stance. He was forced to leave Germany soon after Hitler came to power.

Reich took an increasingly bioenergetic view of libido, perhaps influenced by his tutor Paul Kammerer and another biologist, Otto Heinrich Warburg. In the early 20th century, when molecular biology was in its infancy, developmental biology in particular still presented mysteries that made the idea of a specific life energy respectable, as was articulated by theorists such as Hans Driesch. As a psycho-analyst, Reich aligned such theories with the Freudian libido, while as a materialist, he believed such a life force must be susceptible to physical experiments.

He wrote in his best-known book, The Function of the Orgasm: "Between 1919 and 1921, I became familiar with Driesch's 'Philosophie des Organischen' and his 'Ordnungslehre'... Driesch's contention seemed incontestable to me. He argued that, in the sphere of the life function, the whole could be developed from a part, whereas a machine could not be made from a screw..... However, I couldn't quite accept the transcendentalism of the life principle. Seventeen years later I was able to resolve the contradiction on the basis of a formula pertaining to the function of energy. Driesch's theory was always present in my mind when I thought about vitalism. The vague feeling I had about the irrational nature of his assumption turned out to be justified in the end. He landed among the spiritualists."

The concept of orgone resulted from this work in the psycho-physiology of libido. After Reich migrated to the US, he began to speculate about biological development and evolution and then branched into much broader speculations about the nature of the universe. This led him to the conception of "bions," self-luminescent sub-cellular vesicles that he believed were observable in decaying materials and presumably present universally. Initially, he thought of bions as electrodynamic or radioactive entities, as had the Ukrainian biologist Alexander Gurwitsch, but later concluded that he had discovered an entirely unknown but measurable force, which he then named "orgone", a pseudo-Greek formation probably from org- "impulse, excitement" as in org-asm, plus -one as in ozone (the Greek neutral participle, virtually ,).

For Reich, neurosis became a physical manifestation he called "body armor"—deeply seated tensions and inhibitions in the physical body that were not separated from any mental effects that might be observed. He developed a therapeutic approach he called vegetotherapy that was aimed at opening and releasing this body armor so that free instinctive reflexes—which he considered a token of psychic well-being—could take over.

Evaluation
Orgone was closely associated with sexuality: Reich, following Freud, saw nascent sexuality as the primary energetic force of life. The term itself was chosen to share a root with the word orgasm, which both Reich and Freud took as a fundamental expression of psychological health. This focus on sexuality, while acceptable in the clinical perspective of Viennese psychoanalytic circles, scandalized the conservative American public even as it appealed to countercultural figures like William S. Burroughs and Jack Kerouac.

In some cases, Reich's experimental techniques do not appear to have been very careful or taken precautions to remove experimental bias. Reich was concerned with experimental verification from other scientists. Albert Einstein agreed to participate, but thought Reich's research lacked scientific detachment and experimental rigor; and concluded that the effect was simply due to the temperature gradient inside the room. "Through these experiments I regard the matter as completely solved," he wrote to Reich on 7 February 1941. Upon further correspondence from Reich, Einstein replied that he could not devote any additional time to the matter and asked that his name not be misused for advertising purposes.

Orgone and its related concepts were quickly denounced in the post-World War II American press. Reich and his students were seen as a "cult of sex and anarchy," at least in part because orgone was linked with the title of his book The Function of the Orgasm, and this led to numerous investigations as a communist and denunciation under a wide variety of other pretexts. The psychoanalytical community of the time saw his approach to healing diseases as quackery of the worst sort. In 1954, the U.S. Food and Drug Administration obtained an injunction to prevent Reich from making medical claims relating to orgone, which prevented him from shipping "orgone devices" across state lines, among other stipulations. Reich resisted the order to cease interstate distribution of orgone and was jailed, and the FDA destroyed Reich's books, research materials, and devices at his institute relating to orgone.

Some psychotherapists and psychologists practicing various kinds of Body Psychotherapy and Somatic Psychology have continued to use Reich's proposed emotional-release methods and character-analysis ideas.

In popular culture

Orgone was used in the writings of several prominent beat generation authors, who were fascinated by its purported curative and sexual aspects.  To that extent, it is heavily associated with the 1950s counterculture movement, though it did not carry over into the more extensive movements of the 1960s.

 Devo, a new wave '80s band, claimed that their iconic energy dome design was used to recycle the wasted orgone energy that flows from a person's head. Devo co-founder Mark Mothersbaugh has said:

 Dušan Makavejev opened his 1971 satirical film W.R.: Mysteries of the Organism with documentary coverage of Reich and his development of orgone accumulators, combining this with other imagery and a fictional sub-plot in a collage mocking sexual and political authorities. Scenes include one of only "ten or fifteen orgone boxes left in the country" at that time.
 Evelyn Waugh wrote the novel The Ordeal of Gilbert Pinfold where an orgone accumulator plays an important role. A neighbor of Mr. Pinfold owns a box, and with it, he experiments on Mr. Pinfold's wife. Later, in a hallucinatory state, Mr. Pinfold imagines that his problems have originated from that box. 
 Gorillaz bassist Murdoc Niccals is seen using an Orgone Accumulator during the video for their song, Pac-Man. As part of their online release Song Machine.
 Hal Duncan wrote the book Ink (The Book of All Hours 2), where one of several alternative realities is orgone-based, and in it, orgone ("sexual energy") is used as a primary energy source.
 Hawkwind, a British space rock band, released the song "Orgone Accumulator" as the first track on side three of their 1972 live album, Space Ritual.
 Jack Kerouac wrote in his popular novel On the Road of an orgone accumulator that was treated more as a type of drug than as a medical device: primarily a stimulant, with strong sexual overtones. The 2012 film of Kerouac's novel includes a scene with the device, but adds a small window in the accumulator and a funnel to breathe through.
 J.D. Salinger would sometimes use an orgone accumulator, according to his daughter.
 Kate Bush describes in her song "Cloudbusting" the arrest of Reich through the eyes of his son, Peter.
 Orson Bean, American actor and raconteur, was once a proponent of orgone therapy and published a book about it entitled Me and the Orgone.
 Peep Show, a Channel 4 comedy series, features in the episode "Mark's Women" a cult which defines Orgones as "the invisible molecules of universal life energy which govern our moods and our actions", with negative Orgones being the sources of all the problems in the world.
 Peter Brock, an Australian racing driver, publicly supported orgone and fitted all Holden Dealer Team specials with a device called the "Energy Polariser", which was said to improve the performance and handling of vehicles by "aligning the molecules" using orgone energy.
 Warren Leight wrote in his play Side Man a scene where Gene and Terry receive an orgone box that Gene's friend's wife made him get rid of.
 William S. Burroughs was a major proponent of orgone research, who often included it as part of the surreal imagery in his novels. Orgone interested Burroughs particularly because he believed that it could be used to ease or alleviate "junk sickness"—a popular term for heroin withdrawal. This fitted well in the context of his novels, which were usually narrative recreations of his own experiences with narcotics and the Beat life. Burroughs explicitly compares "kicking the habit" to cancer in the novel Junky and ties it to the use of orgone accumulators. At the time that Burroughs was writing, orgone accumulators were only available from Reich's Orgone Institute in New York, offered for a ten dollar per month donation. Burroughs built his own instead, substituting rock wool for the sheet iron, but believed it still achieved the desired effect.
 Woody Allen's 1973 comedy science fiction movie Sleeper features an orgasmatron—a cylinder big enough to hold one or two people, containing some future technology that rapidly induces orgasms. This is required as almost all people in the movie's universe are impotent or frigid, although males of Italian descent are considered the least impotent of all groups. It has been suggested that the orgasmatron was a parody of Reich's orgone accumulator.
Science fiction author Damien Benoit-Ledoux fictionalized orgone energy as the mysterious and accidental source of superhuman abilities in his Guardians superhero novel series. Key moments in the story take place inside the fictional underground base beneath Orgonon in Rangeley, ME.

See also
 Alexander Gurwitsch
 Animal magnetism of Franz Anton Mesmer
 Energy (spiritual)
 Energy medicine
 Fringe science
 Integratron
 List of ineffective cancer treatments
 Odic force of Carl Reichenbach
 Rupert Sheldrake
 Scientific skepticism
 Thetan
 Vitalism
 Vril

References

External links

Quackwatch article

Body psychotherapy
Energy (esotericism)
Orgonomy
Pseudoscience
Vitalism
Sexology